Cryptocephalus is a genus of leaf beetles in the subfamily Cryptocephalinae and belonging to the group of case-bearing leaf beetles called the Camptosomata.

See also
 List of Cryptocephalus species

References

External links
 
 European Chrysomelidae: Cryptocephalus by Lech Borowiec. Retrieved 2007-JAN-08.
 North American Cryptocephalus species

Cryptocephalinae
 
Chrysomelidae genera
Taxa named by Étienne Louis Geoffroy